The Central Highlands Rugby League (CHRL) is a Rugby league competition District in the Australian state of Victoria. It covers the area of Victoria centered on Ballarat and Ararat, and its jurisdiction stretches as far north as Creswick, Warrnambool in the south west, Bacchus Marsh in the east, and Horsham in the west.

History

The CHRL District was established and registered with the ARL and VRL in 2005 by founder Ken James (previously Club Manager of MRL team 'Ballarat Highlanders Rugby League Club') after a necessity arose to start a competition in the western region of Victoria separate from the Melbourne Rugby League (MRL) District.

The CHRL competition started with two junior age levels but in 2008 due to the 11-year drought finally taking its toll on Central Victoria the council deemed the sports grounds used in the competition too dangerous for use.
This temporarily ended competition for the CHRL (and some clubs in other sports too). After another 2 years of the fields not being used the councils re-allocated the fields to other purposes, ending the ability for clubs in the CHRL to continue until new home grounds are established.

Past Clubs in CHRL

Proposed Clubs

Extended competition

The CHRL also hosted matches in Ballarat between combined CHRL teams made up of players from both Ballarat Dragons and Ararat Cowboys against Altona Roosters and Sunbury Cougars, both from the MRL District, which expanded the experience of players at district representative level.

Current
There is no club rugby league competition in the region as of 2022, with the exception of the Stawell Mounties who play in the Limestone Coast competition.

See also

Rugby league in Victoria
Rugby League Competitions in Australia

References

External links
Central Highlands Rugby League official site
The Victorian Rugby League
Rugby League clubs in Victoria

Rugby league competitions in Australia
Rugby league in Victoria (Australia)
2005 establishments in Australia
Sports leagues established in 2005